

Cowley Road is an arterial road in the city of Oxford, England, running southeast from near the city centre at The Plain near Magdalen Bridge, through the inner city area of East Oxford, and to the industrial suburb of Cowley. The central shopping is at 

Cowley Road is also the main shopping street of East Oxford, and in the evenings it is the area's main leisure district.

Cowley Road, like most of Oxford, has an ethnically and economically diverse population. This includes significant, long-standing South Asian and Afro-Caribbean communities, who have been joined more recently by East European, Chinese and African arrivals. Alongside these ethnic groups, East Oxford plays host to many members of the city's academic population, both undergraduate and academic staff, and is home to many politically active groups.

Cowley Road has high levels of both road traffic and pedestrian traffic, and space for both is limited. In 2005, Oxfordshire County Council invested about £1,000,000 from central government to re-model the busiest part of Cowley Road.

Music and culture
The Cowley Road area has played a prominent part in the Oxford music scene. A number of successful bands made their formative performances in local venues such as the O2 Academy Oxford (formerly known as The Zodiac), and The Bullingdon (formerly The Art Bar). Famous Oxford bands have included Supergrass, Radiohead and Ride.

Cowley Road was also home to the Cowley Road Carnival, an annual event when the road was pedestrianised, and which featured live music, static sound systems, a parade, and food from around the world. Cowley Road Carnival became an integral part of contemporary Oxford. Held on the first Sunday in July it celebrated the multicultural diversity of the city and regularly attracted around 50,000 visitors. The COVID-19 pandemic caused cancellation of the street carnival and in 2022 the organisers announced closure of the Carnival.

A house party on the Cowley Road was the site to the UK band Foals' first ever gig.

See also
 CowleyRoad.org - an open access visual archive of the road
 Ultimate Picture Palace, Jeune Street, off Cowley Road

References

Sources and further reading

Roads in Oxfordshire
Shopping streets in Oxford